Ariège may refer to:

 Ariège (department), a department in the Occitanie region of southwestern France, named after the river of the same name
 Ariège (river), a river in southern France
 SS Ariège, a cargo ship
 Ariege, a filly that is a descendant of Kentucky Derby winner Northern Dancer, via Kostroma